Calyptostomatidae is a family of mites in the order Trombidiformes. There are at least two genera and about six described species in Calyptostomatidae.

Genera
These two genera belong to the family Calyptostomatidae:
 Calyptostoma Cambridge, 1875
 Smaris Latreille, 1796

References

Further reading

 
 
 

Trombidiformes
Acari families